Troon railway station may refer to:

Scotland
 Troon railway station (current)
 Troon (Harbour) railway station (closed)
 Troon railway station (1839-1892) (closed)
 Troon Goods railway station (closed) in Troon, South Ayrshire

Belgium
 Trône/Troon metro station in Brussels

See also 
 Barassie railway station - serves Barassie, slightly north of Troon, Scotland
 Troon (disambiguation)